The University of Rajshahi, also known as Rajshahi University or RU (Bengali: রাজশাহী বিশ্ববিদ্যালয়), is a public co-educational research university in Bangladesh situated near the northern Bangladeshi city of Rajshahi in a  campus at Motihar,  East of the Rajshahi city center. It is the second largest, in terms of academic activities and campus area and also the second oldest, university in Bangladesh. The university's 60 departments are organized into ten faculties. It is considered one of the top research universities in Bangladesh. Researchers of this university have recently contributed a significant amount of effort and played a key role in bringing back medieval Bangladeshi Muslin fiber. It has a formidable alumnus base around Bangladesh and abroad. Because of its beautiful and well-planned verdurous campus, academic atmosphere and traditional inclination towards outdoor sports, it is popularly known as the Cambridge of the East.

History 

The first proposal to establish a university came in 1917, when Calcutta University created the Sadler Commission to assess the university system in Bengal. However, the recommendations of the report had no immediate consequences.

The University of Dhaka was established in 1921. Demand for a university in the northern part of East Bengal gained momentum when two universities were set-up quickly in West Pakistan, using funding diverted from East Bengal, without the establishment of any in the east. Students of Rajshahi College were at the forefront of the movement demanding a new university. Finally, Rajshahi was selected as the home for the second university in East Bengal and the Rajshahi University Act of 1953 (East Bengal Act XV of 1953) was passed by the East Pakistan provincial Assembly on 31 March 1953. Itrat Hossain Zuberi, the principal of Rajshahi College was appointed its first vice-chancellor.

Initially, the university was housed in temporary locations, such as the local Circuit House and Boro Kuthi, an 18th-century Dutch establishment. B B Hindu Academy, a local school, housed the library, teachers' lounge and the medical center. The university started out with 20 professors, 161 students (of which 5 were female) and six departments — Bengali, English, History, Law, Philosophy and Economics. In 1964, the offices moved to the permanent campus.

The 1960s was a turbulent period in Bangladesh, when demands for East Pakistani autonomy became stronger. The students and staff of the university started playing an increasing role in politics. On 18 February 1969, Shamsuzzoha, a professor, was killed by the police when he tried to prevent them from shooting student demonstrators. This date is now commemorated as Zoha Day. During the Bangladesh Liberation War of 1971, the campus was used as a base by the Pakistan Army. A number of professors, students and officers of the university were killed by the Pakistan army.

After independence, a new Act regarding the administration of the university came into being — the Rajshahi University Act, 1973. The post-independence years saw the university grow steadily in student enrolment and size of the academic staff. However the 1980s were turbulent for the university, as the students agitated with other institutions of the country against the military rule of Hossain Muhammad Ershad. Since the early 1990s, the university has seen relative calm and lowering of session backlogs, though active student politics remains a contentious issue.

Emblem 
The circle of the emblem represents the world. An open book is shown in red and gold: red represents one of the colors of the national flag and gold the value of education. The body of the book is blue, the color of the sky, and at the center is a shapla flower (Nymphaeaceae), the national flower of Bangladesh.

Campus

The university's main campus is in Motihar, on the eastern side of the city of Rajshahi and a mile from the Bangladeshi coast of the river Padma. Access to the walled-off campus is controlled through three security gates. It houses eleven large academic buildings — five for the arts, business studies and social sciences, four for the natural and applied sciences and two for agricultural studies.

Rail Line and University Station 
The Dhaka-Rajshahi rail line passes through the campus and it has a dedicated station named the University Station. It is near the Shahid Shohrawardy Hall on the southern border of the campus. There is an internal bazar nearby for the students only, called the station bazar.

Gates 
There are four gates of the university, three being upon the Dhaka - Rajshahi Highway. The westernmost gate is the Kazla gate which provides access to the Western part of the campus mainly playgrounds and residential areas. The easternmost gate is the Binodpur gate that provides access to the Eastern Part of the campus and the Main gate in between these two provides access to the main administrative and academic portion of the campus. The fourth gate is on the other side of the campus and provides access to the campus from the other side of the city. The main gate used to create an architectural optical illusion while entering or exiting the campus through it as it seemed to the visitor that the more he tries to go nearer the more the Administrative Building goes far away.

Forests 
There is an artificial forest in the campus. Called as "Matihar Udyan", it is situated in the eastern-most side of the campus. University fire station is situated near its southern side. It provides a serene enviornment and refreshment for the students and campus' joggers.

Parks, Lakes and Sanctuaries 
There is a central park of the university near the Shaheed Minar Complex. It is a small park providing a very good environment and a place for spending leisure for the students and residents of the campus. Rajshahi University Botanical Garden is also a park inside the campus home to some very rare species of trees and plants. There used to be a mini park-like plantation near the main gate but it was cut down during mid 2020s. There are two big lakes inside the campus. One is behind the Shahid Shamsuzzoha Hall popularly known as the Shorobor and another is behind the female hostels known as a part of the Junge Genome Project. Apart from these, there are nearly fifty ponds around the campus.

There is a large bird sanctuary inside the campus called the Jungle Genome Project. It is an ecological project of the Zoology Department and it has natural plantations and lakes inside it.

Paris Road 
Paris road is a street in the campus which is often considered the signature of the Rajshahi University Campus. It starts from the adjoining point of Kazla Gate road, Paschimpara road and Paris road near the Juberi Guest House and runs straight East from this. Then it keeps going past the mango plantations, Kazla pond and VC's residence and reaches the Shamsuzoha Square. Then from the Shamsuzzoha Square, it goes East past the University Bank, Second Administrative Building, University Central Bus Station, Central Mosque, university park and Shahid Minar Complex and Shahid Smiti Sangrahashala Museum and ends at the gate of the Sher e Bangla  Hall.

Murals, Sculptures and Monuments 
There are a considerable number of murals on the campus. The Shahid Minar Complex holds two murals one on the background wall of the Open Theatre Stage and another on the background wall of the Shahid Minar's platform. A mural near the Golden Jubilee Tower is a masterpiece artifact made of steel depicting struggle of men and women. Besides these the obelisk of Martyred professor Dr. Shamsuzzoha has a mural depicting him and his famous quote. The Bangabandhu hall, Sher-e-Bangla hall and Syed Ameer Ali Hal have murals of Sheikh Mujibur Rahman, AK Fazlul Haque and Syed Ameer Ali respectively.

Monuments around the campus are the Shaheed Minar, Mass-Graveyard monument and the Shabash Bangladesh. The sculptures are the martyred intellectual memorial monument near the central library, Sfulingo in the Shahid Samsuzzoha Hall premises, Martyred Professor Habibur Rahman's sculpture on Shahid Habibur Rahman hall's entrance. There are several memorial monuments and murals around the campus.

Facilities

Museums 
The university is the site for the two oldest museums in Bangladesh. They are - the Varendra Research Museum, which is the oldest museum in Bangladesh and the Shahid Smriti Sangrahasala, which is the oldest liberation war museum in Bangladesh.

A few miles from the main campus is the Varendra Research Museum,. It is one of the richest repertory of Bengal sculptures in the world. Established in 1910 by Ramaprasad Chanda, the museum became a part of the university in the 1960s when a financial crisis threatened its existence. Under the university, the museum has thrived, adding a folklore gallery to its impressive collection from ancient and medieval Bengal.

Juberi Guest House 
Juberi Guest House is one of the earliest structures on the campus. It is actually a complex of guest house, lounge and café. Juberi House is the home of Rajshahi University Club and it is the center of the political activities of the teachers and fellows. There are four buildings providing caravansary facilities for the guests of the university. It provides gymnasium facilities for the teachers and it has a well maintained lone tennis court

Sport and other facilities for cultural activities 

Rajshahi University Stadium seats 30,000.

There is a swimming pool with stands for spectators and a gymnasium and indoor stadium situated near the stadium.

Architecture 

University of Rajshahi is home to many architectural and artistic landmarks. Most of its academic, cultural, residential and administrative buildings are of modern architectural style. The Shaheed Minar is an important example, complete with a mural designed by Murtaza Bashir. The Senate House is a modern mini-parliament house, has 206 rooms and is fully air-conditioned. It is usually used for meetings of the senate of the university, but it accommodates national and international conferences, seminars and symposia. In front of the Senate House is Shabash Bangladesh, one of the largest war memorial sculptures, designed and constructed by Nitun Kundu. The name comes from a poem by Sukanta Bhattacharya of the same name, the last four lines of which are engraved under the structure.

Golden Jubilee Tower, a 2003 addition to the university's array of sculptures, commemorates its 50th anniversary. It is right beside the main gate. It has also an open theatre and two beautiful murals.  Other well-known buildings include the library and the university mosque. The Department of Fine Arts hosts a sizeable collection of contemporary art, while Varendra Museum has a large collection of ancient and medieval art.

Organization and administration
The university is run according to the Rajshahi University Act, 1973. This Act, passed on 25 September 1973, allows the university considerably more autonomy than most other peer institutions. The president of Bangladesh is the de facto chancellor, but the role is mainly ceremonial. The highest official after the chancellor is the vice-chancellor, selected by the senate of the university every four years. The vice-chancellor, as of June 2017, is M. Abdus Sobhan.

Other important officers include the pro vice-chancellor, the registrar, the controller of examinations and the proctor. The proctor is in direct charge of student activities and is the official with most direct contact with the students. The most important statutory bodies of the university are the senate, the academic council and the syndicate.

Most of Rajshahi University's funding comes from the government. The Bangladesh University Grants Commission is the body responsible for allocating funds to all public universities.

Students are admitted after they pass the Higher Secondary Exam (HSC exam). In earlier days students partook in entrance examinations, a separate one for each department. This has been a contentious issue, as there used to be only one exam for each faculty, after which students would be allocated to departments according to their result and choice of program.

The tuition fees are relatively low; nevertheless, a hike in admission fees, during the 2006–07 session, drew criticism from student bodies. In 2007, the university awarded a total of 340 scholarships, whose annual value is around 1.1 million taka. In addition, there are merit awards given by residential halls, departments and the university itself. Students are eligible for the Prime Minister's Gold Medal award.

All colleges of the northern and southern regions of the country used to be affiliated with University of Rajshahi. However, the administration of colleges across the country was taken over by the National University when it was established in 1992.

List of vice-chancellors
 Itrat Husain Zuberi (6 July 1953 – 30 September 1957)
 Momtazuddin Ahmed (1 October 1957 – 30 August 1965)
 Muhammad Shamsul Huq (31 August 1965 – 4 August 1969)
 Syed Sajjad Hussain (5 August 1969 – 18 July 1971)
 Muhammad Abdul Bari (19 July 1971 – 8 January 1972)
 Khan Sarwar Murshid (1 February 1972 – 3 August 1974)
 Mazharul Islam (4 August 1974 – 18 September 1975)
 Syed Ali Ahsan (27 September 1975 – 22 June 1977)
 Muhammad Abdul Bari (7 July 1977 – 17 February 1981)
 Makbular Rahman Sarkar (26 February 1981 – 22 February 1982)
 Moslem Huda (22 February 1982 – 20 September 1982)
 Abdul Rakib (4 October 1982 – 19 March 1988)
 Amanullah Ahmed (20 March 1988 – 22 July 1992)
 M. Anisur Rahman (22 July 1992 – 22 August 1994)
 M. Yusuf Ali (22 August 1994 – 16 February 1997)
 Abdul Khaleque (17 February 1997 – 3 August 1999)
 M. Sayeedur Rahman Khan (4 August 1999 – 13 November 2001)
 Faisul Islam Farouqui (13 November 2001 – 5 June 2005)
 Md. Altaf Hossain (5 June 2005 – 15 May 2008)
 Mumnunul Keramat (acting) (16 May 2008 – 28 February 2009)
 M Abdus Sobhan (26 February 2009 – 25 February 2013)
 Muhammad Mizanuddin (19 March 2013 – 20 March 2017)
 M Abdus Sobhan (7 May 2017 – 6 May 2021)
 Professor Dr. Golam Shabbir Sattar (29 August 2021 – present )

Faculties and departments

The university's 58 departments are organised into 12 faculties: Arts, Engineering, Fine Arts, Law, Science, Business Studies, Social Sciences, Life Sciences, Earth Sciences, Agriculture, Fisheries, Veterinary & Animal Sciences. The Arts and the Law faculties are the oldest, both established in 1953, closely followed by the Faculty of Science (1956) and the Faculty of Engineering (est. 2009). The university's departments represent the traditional studies in arts, commerce, sciences and engineering through programs such as English, history, languages and linguistics, economics, business studies, mathematics, applied mathematics, physics, computer science & engineering, chemistry, statistics, geology & mining, geography, psychology, zoology, botany, etc. The university is increasingly emphasising more specialised programs such as pharmacy, biochemistry, information and communication engineering (ICE), genetics and breeding.

Faculty of Life Sciences
 Botany
 Zoology
 Genetic Engineering & Biotechnology
  Microbiology
 Clinical Psychology
 Psychology

Faculty of Arts
Prominent departments in the faculty of Arts are
 Department of Philosophy
 Department of History
 Department of English
 Department of Bengali
 Department of Islamic History and Culture
 Department of Arabic
 Department of Islamic Studies
 Department of Music
 Department of Theater
 Department of Persian Language and Literature
 Department of Urdu
 Department of Sanskrit

Faculty of Fine Arts

The Faculty of Fine Arts has 3 departments;

Faculty of Law
The Faculty of Law has two departments:
 Department of Law
 Department of Law and Land Administration

The Department of Law is one of the pioneer institutes for graduate level legal education in Bangladesh as well as in South Asia. It was the first institution in South Asia that offered B.Jur. Honours (Bachelor of Jurisprudence) from the year 1970. Now it offers LLB (Honors), LLM, Evening LLM, MPhil and Ph.D. in the field of Law. It has a great number of alumni and former members of the faculty around the world including former Chief Justice of Bangladesh, former Prime Minister of Bangladesh, current and former ministers and many former and current judges of the apex courts of Bangladesh and many more formidable legal and political minds of the country. Abul Hasnat Muhammad Qamaruzzaman was a student of this department.

The Department of Law and Land Administration was established in the session of 2015–16. It is the pioneer department in Bangladesh in the field of education on Laws relating to land administration, land management and land survey. All core courses of Law are taught here. Graduates of this discipline can apply for all jobs which are for Law graduates, including the positions of Assistant Judge and Judicial Magistrate. They are able to practice as both civil and criminal lawyers and also as Income Tax lawyers. In addition, they are able to apply for jobs in the field of land administration/management. It is currently under consideration that a separate BCS Cadre (Land) may be created and graduates from this discipline will only be able to apply for those jobs. The programs offered by this Department include LLB (Honours), LLM, MPhil and Ph.D.

Initiatives are under process to establish a new department in the field of corporate law under this faculty which is going to be the first institution for graduate level education in this field within Bangladesh.

This faculty is well known for the innovative environment on its premises. A huge library is provided here for the students and researchers.  The Bangladesh code was developed and was given a great shape for practical use under the leadership of a former chairman of this department in 2006.

One of the leading debating clubs of the campus belongs to this department. Having a great tradition of mooting, and some nationally popular great legal practitioners as alumni, its Mooting Club RUMCS is well recognized and reputed in Bangladesh.

Faculty of Engineering
The Faculty of Engineering include the following departments
 Textile Engineering
 Information and Communication Engineering (ICE) (est. 2000)
 Computer Science & Engineering
 Applied Chemistry & Chemical Engineering
 Materials Science and Engineering
 Electrical and Electronic Engineering (EEE) (est. 2015)

In the late 1990 and 2000s, programs in computer science & engineering and Information & Communication Engineering were introduced. The newest addition to the Faculty of Engineering in the Department of Electrical and Electronic Engineering in 2015. The university used to have a separate engineering program through the Bangladesh Institute of Technology Rajshahi, which became an independent university: Rajshahi University of Engineering & Technology in 2002. University authorities have decided to merge Applied physics and electronic engineering department with the electrical and electronic engineering department on 5 December 2018.

Faculty of Social Science

The Social Science Faculty has the following departments:

 Economics
 Political Science
 Social Work
 Sociology
 Mass Communication and Journalism
 Information Science & Library Management
 Public Administration
 Anthropology
 Folklore
 International Relations

Faculty of Business Studies 
Faculty of Business Studies has following departments:

 Finance
 Accounting & Information Systems
 Marketing
 Management Studies
 Banking & Insurance
 Tourism & Hospitality Management

All of these departments are in the Rabindra Building.

Faculty of Science
Faculty of Science has the following departments:

 Mathematics
 Physics
 Chemistry
 Statistics
 Biochemistry & Molecular Biology
 Pharmacy
 Population Science and Human Resource Development (website:http://www.popsru.org)
 Applied Mathematics
 Physical Education and Sports Sciences

Most of these departments are in the 2nd, 3rd and 4th science buildings.

Faculty of Agriculture

Faculty of Agriculture has the following departments:

 Agronomy and Agricultural Extension
 Crop Science and Technology 

Crop science was established in 2005. It offers a 4-year B.Sc.Ag.(Hons) degree and 18 months M.S. degree. MPhil and Doctor of Philosophy (Ph.D.) degrees are also offered. About 250 students are studying in the department.

All of these departments are in the Agricultural Faculty Building.  Only 'practical work' is performed in Narikelbaria Campus. Founded in 2000, the Faculty of Agriculture was formed when a local agricultural college was absorbed into the university.

Faculty of Geosciences
 Geography & Environmental Studies
 Geology & Mining

Faculty of Veterinary & Animal Sciences
 Veterinary & Animal Sciences

Faculty of Fisheries
 Fisheries

Institutes
There are six institutes of Rajshahi University.

 Institutes of Bangladesh Studies
 Institutes of Biological Science
 Institute of Business Administration
 Institute of Education and Research
 Institute of English and Other Languages
 Institute of Environmental Science

Affiliating National Professional Academies
 Bangladesh Police Academy.

Affiliating Non-Government Engineering Tech Colleges under Rajshahi University
 Abul Hossain College of Engineering, Rangpur
 Advanced Engineering College, Rajshahi
 Ashrai Engineering College, Rajshahi
 BCMC college of ENGINEERING and TECHNOLOGY, Jashore
 Epsilon Engineering College, Rajshahi
 Global Institute of Science and Technology, Rajshahi
 Imperial College of Engineering, Khulna
 KSFL Engineering College, Dinajpur
 Pabna Engineering College, Pabna
 Rajshahi Engineering Science & Technology college, Rajshahi
 Rangpur Engineering College
 South East Engineering College, Khulna
 TMSS Engineering College, Thengamara (Rangpur Road), Bougra (Website: http://tec.edu.bd/)
 United B.Sc. Engineering College

Affiliating Non-Government Agriculture Colleges under Rajshahi University
 Tamaltala Agriculture and Technical College, Natore
 International Institute of Applied Science & Technology, Rangpur
 Henry Institute of Bioscience and Technology, Sirajganj
 Anowara College of Bioscience, Dinajpur
 Rajshahi Institute of Biosciences, Rajshahi
 Varendra Institute of Biosciences
 Udayan College of Bioscience & Technology, Rajshahi(UCBT)
 Bhashasoinik Gaziul Haque Institute of Bioscience, Bogura

Student life

Housing

The university has 18 residential halls for students, six for women and eleven for men and one International Dormitory. The halls are named after prominent Bangladeshi historical and cultural figures, some of them from Rajshahi. The largest men's hall is Shahid Habibur Rahman Hall, named after a mathematics professor killed on campus during the 1971 war by the Pakistani Army. The largest women's hall is Monnujan Hall, followed by Begum Rokeya Hall, named after Rokeya Sakhawat Hussain, a leading figure in women's rights activism in Bengal.

The housing system can accommodate more than 10,000 students, which has created a deepening accommodation crisis as the student body has risen to 25,000. Apart from the seat limitations, the amenities of these halls do not always meet decent accommodation standards. This has led to the establishment of many privately owned off-campus "messes". The residential halls provide meals, which are subsidised by the university authorities.

Names of halls

Activities

The physical education department of the university has 27 instructors and is equipped with a 25,000-seat stadium, two gymnasiums, one swimming pool, four football grounds, one hockey ground, four tennis courts, two basketball courts and a squash court.

The Teacher Students Center was designed to be the center of cultural activities of the university. Reception of fresh students, celebration of national holidays, and the annual cultural competition are key cultural events at the campus. The university is home to recitation groups like Shwanan, and drama groups like Anushilon and the Rajshahi University Drama Association. A vibrant fine arts scene thrives around the Department of Fine Arts, and the campus hosts exhibitions each year. The university has branches of all major national cultural groups, including Udichi and Gono Natto Shongstha.

During the three major national days — Language Movement Day (21 February), Independence Day (26 March) and Victory Day (16 December) —  the university hosts public meetings, cultural programs and political activities. On these days, students and teachers, going barefoot, congregate around the Shaheed Minar and pay their respect. During the major Muslim religious occasions of Eid, the university is usually deserted as students go home to be with their families. Other religiously important days like Shabe-barat are observed through discussions and religious activities. The major Hindu festival celebrated in the university is Saraswati Puja—Saraswati, the goddess of knowledge, is worshiped in a central location as well as individually in many residential halls. The Bengali new year, Pohela Baisakh is also observed with much pomp.

Notable alumni

Category:University of Rajshahi alumni

Incidents and controversies
During the 1980s, the four-year honors course took as long as eight years due to the session backlogs, resulting mainly from conflicts between factions of political groups. Since the early 1990s, student politics has been calmer, with student body elections not being held for more than a decade. The student groups have been demanding elections whereas others feel student politics should be banned.

In late 2004 and early 2005, two professors of Rajshahi University got assassinated within three months: Professor Yunus from the Economics department in December 2004 and Professor Taher from the Geology and Mining department in February 2005. Both murders were suspected to be driven by political motivations. In 2006, the commander of Jama'atul Mujahideen Bangladesh admitted to the Rapid Action Battalion interrogators that his operatives carried out the attack on Yunus, as well as the 2004 attack on writer Humayun Azad, the murder of another writer, bomb blasts, and attacks on cinemas.

Around the same time, a controversy over the hiring of over 500 new employees broke; detractors suggested that they were hired illegally, either in return for money or for political reasons.

In 2005, Muhammad Asadullah Al-Ghalib, professor of the department of Arabic, was arrested on suspicion of militant activities, but was acquitted from all charges in 2008.

In August 2007, six detained professors of the university were temporarily suspended for their involvement in organizing protests that violated Emergency Power Rules, though they were discharged later from allegations and returned to the university.

In November 2017, a woman student was abducted from the university campus, sparking protests by students demanding her rescue and improved security on the campus.

In July 2018 protests and counter-violence erupted at various universities over the "quota reform movement," which sought to change the quota system that allocated 56% of Bangladesh government jobs to specific "entitled" classes. The vice-chancellor, Professor M. Abdus Sobhan, dismissed the quota-reform movement as an "antigovernmental movement with a motive to carry out sabotage."

The student and quota-reform movement leader Toriqul Islam, and 15 others, were attacked during their protest march, 2 July 2018, by opposing students. The Daily Star, which filmed the incident, identified 10 of the attackers as leaders and activists of the Bangladesh Chhatra League, a pro-Awami League (Bangladesh's ruling party) student organization.  Video footage and photos published in Bangladeshi media showed BCL men with sticks, bamboo poles, a dagger and a hammer beating Toriqul, who suffered a broken leg and severe head injury. Several police officers standing nearby (unaware the incident was being filmed) did not intervene until the attack was finished, then took the victim to hospital without arresting any of the attackers, publicly denying it was anything more than a "scuffle." University authorities declined to investigate, for lack of a filed complaint. Images of the attack, distributed on social media, sparked widespread criticism over police and university administration inaction.

Despite student Toriqul's unresolved major injuries, the university's Rajshahi Medical College Hospital discharged him 5 July 2018, forcing his doctor to arrange for immediate surgery elsewhere.

Gallery

See also

 Bangladesh University of Engineering and Technology (BUET)
 Bangladesh University of Textiles (BUTEX)
 Islamic University, Bangladesh (IU) Kushtia
 Islamic University of Technology (IUT)
 List of universities in Bangladesh
 University of Dhaka

Notes

References

 .
 .
 .

External links
 Official website

 
Educational institutions established in 1953
Public universities of Bangladesh
1953 establishments in East Pakistan
Organisations based in Rajshahi